Aberdeen F.C. competed in Scottish Football League Division One and Scottish Cup in season 1913–14.

Overview

This was Aberdeen's ninth season in the top flight of Scottish football and their tenth overall in League football. The club finished in 14th place out of 20 clubs in  Division One. In the Scottish Cup, they lost in the second round to St Mirren in a 1–2 defeat at home. A financial crisis at the club (partly due to falling attendances due to the First World War) meant that the club's best players were put up for sale.

Results

Scottish Division One

Final standings

Scottish Cup

Squad

Appearances & Goals

|}

References

1913-14
Aberdeen